Thuto is the third studio album by South African recording artist and record producer Cassper Nyovest. A follow-up to his 2015 album Refiloe, Thuto was released on 5 May 2017 by his imprint Family Tree Records with support from Bridge Entertainment.

Background and promotion
Cassper Nyovest described the project "his best work yet", and claimed the album reached gold status on the first day of its release. Upon the revealing of the tracklist, he revealed on the photo and video-sharing website Instagram that he named the album "Thuto" in dedication to his elder sister Thuto Phoolo, whose birthday coincided with the album's release date. The album was supported by the single "Tito Mboweni", and features vocal guest appearances from Tsepo Tshola, Black Thought, Nadia Nakai, Tshego, Goapele and Riky Rick. Its production was handled by Alie Keyz, Anatii, Gobbla, DJ Abza, Fenesse, Lae and Zero. On 7 May 2017, he hosted the official CD launch at the Zone 6 Venue with notable artists present including Kwesta, Naak Musiq, Kid X, DJ Switch, K.O, DJ Vigilante and DJ Dimplez.

Critical reception

Thuto was released to widespread acclaim from various music websites and online outlets. Respected Nigerian music critic Joey Akan of Pulse Nigeria described the album as "a celebration of that power, and the offering of new music" and argues that the "album shows all the sides of Cassper Nyovest as South Africa’s leading Hip hop voice". In the same vein, The Stars Davies Ndolo gave the album 3.5/5, writing "Cassper continues to grow into one of the deepest figures in modern hip hop and "Thuto" is the evidence of this. We can only hope his music will continue to make a significant mark in the industry". Independent Online was impressed with the growth Cassper Nyovest has made lyrically since his last album and further observed that "The moment his voice cuts into the soulful melody of Confused, the opening track on Thuto, it’s evident that this is something we’ve haven't heard from him before.". However, Phumlani Langa of South Africa Channel 24 was not impressed with the production and lyrical content of the project, writing: "The illest thing about this album is the stolen adlib “sha-sha!” That’s it, a whole record and the only quotable I recall is ... “sha-sha!".

Track listing
Credits adapted from the album's liner notes.

Notes
"Destiny" contains samples, interpolations and resung lyrics from "Destiny" by Malaika
"Touch the Sky" contains a sample from "Touch The Sky" by Dennis Ferrer
"Baby Girl" contains a sample from "Dilemma" by Nelly & Kelly Rowland

Certifications and sales

Release history

References

2017 albums
Cassper Nyovest albums
Family Tree Records albums